In algebraic topology, a Steenrod algebra was defined by  to be the algebra of stable cohomology operations for mod  cohomology.

For a given prime number , the Steenrod algebra  is the graded Hopf algebra over the field  of order , consisting of all stable cohomology operations for mod  cohomology.

The term "Steenrod algebra" is also sometimes used for the algebra of cohomology operations of a generalized cohomology theory.

Cohomology operations

A cohomology operation is a natural transformation between cohomology functors. For example, if we take cohomology with coefficients in a ring , the cup product squaring operation yields a family of cohomology operations:

Cohomology operations need not be homomorphisms of graded rings; see the Cartan formula below.

These operations do not commute with suspension—that is, they are unstable. Steenrod constructed stable operations

for all  greater than zero. The notation  and their name, the Steenrod squares, comes from the fact that  restricted to classes of degree  is the cup square. There are analogous operations for odd primary coefficients, usually denoted  and called the reduced -th power operations:

This is the mod 2 Steenrod algebra.

.

As a cohomology ring 
We can summarize the properties of the Steenrod operations as generators in the cohomology ring of Eilenberg–Maclane spectra
,
since there is an isomorphism

Note the inverse limit of cohomology groups appears because it is a computation in the stable range of cohomology groups of Eilenberg–Maclane spaces.

Note there is a dual characterization using homology for the dual Steenrod algebra.

Remark about generalizing to generalized cohomology theories 
It should be observed if the Eilenberg–Maclane spectrum  is replaced by an arbitrary spectrum , then there are many challenges for studying the cohomology ring . In this case, the generalized dual Steenrod algebra  should be considered instead because it has much better properties and can be tractably studied in many cases (such as ). In fact, these ring spectra are commutative and the  bimodules  are flat.

Axiomatic characterization

 showed that the Steenrod squares  are characterized by the following 5 axioms:

Naturality:  is an additive homomorphism and is natural with respect to any , so .
 is the identity homomorphism.
If  then 
Cartan Formula: 

In addition the Steenrod squares have the following properties: 
 is the Bockstein homomorphism  of the exact sequence 
 commutes with the connecting morphism of the long exact sequence in cohomology. In particular, it commutes with respect to suspension 
They satisfy the Adem relations, described below

Naturality:  is an additive homomorphism and natural.
 is the identity homomorphism.
 is the cup -th power on classes of degree .
If  then 
Cartan Formula: 

As before, the reduced p-th powers also satisfy the Adem relations and commute with the suspension and boundary operators.

Adem relations

They are given by

for all  such that . (The binomial coefficients are to be interpreted mod 2.) The Adem relations allow one to write an arbitrary composition of Steenrod squares as a sum of Serre–Cartan basis elements.

For odd  the Adem relations are

for a<pb and

Bullett–Macdonald identities

 reformulated the Adem relations as the following identities.

For  put

then the Adem relations are equivalent to 

For  put

then the Adem relations are equivalent to the statement that 

Geometric interpretation 
There is a nice straightforward geometric interpretation of the Steenrod squares using manifolds representing cohomology classes. Suppose  is a smooth manifold and consider a cohomology class  represented geometrically as a smooth submanifold . Cohomologically, if we let  represent the fundamental class of  then the pushforward map

In addition, associated to this immersion is a real vector bundle call the normal bundle . The Steenrod squares of  can now be understood — they are the pushforward of the Stiefel–Whitney class of the normal bundle

which gives a geometric reason for why the Steenrod products eventually vanish. Note that because the Steenrod maps are group homomorphisms, if we have a class  which can be represented as a sum

Also, this equivalence is strongly related to the Wu formula.

Computations

Complex projective spaces
On the complex projective plane , there are only the following non-trivial cohomology groups,
,
as can be computed using a cellular decomposition. In  the square

It can also be computed directly using the Cartan formula since  and

Infinite Real Projective Space
The Steenrod operations for real projective spaces can be readily computed using the formal properties of the Steenrod squares. Recall that

where  For the operations on  we know that

The Cartan relation implies that the total square

is a ring homomorphism

Hence

Since there is only one degree  component of the previous sum, we have that

Construction

Properties of the Steenrod algebra 
In addition to the axiomatic structure the Steenrod algebra satisfies, it has a number of additional useful properties.

Basis for the Steenrod algebra

In particular they found an explicit basis for the Steenrod algebra. This basis relies on a certain notion of admissibility for integer sequences. We say a sequence

is admissible if for each , we have that . Then the elements

where  is an admissible sequence, form a basis (the Serre–Cartan basis) for the mod 2 Steenrod algebra, called the admissible basis. There is a similar basis for the case  consisting of the elements

,

such that

Hopf algebra structure and the Milnor basis

The Steenrod algebra has more structure than a graded -algebra. It is also a Hopf algebra, so that in particular there is a diagonal or comultiplication map

induced by the Cartan formula for the action of the Steenrod algebra on the cup product. This map is easier to describe than the product map, and is given by

.

These formulas imply that the Steenrod algebra is co-commutative.

The monomial basis for  then gives another choice of basis for A, called the Milnor basis. The dual to the Steenrod algebra is often more convenient to work with, because the multiplication is (super) commutative.

 where , and
 if .

Relation to formal groups

The dual Steenrod algebras are supercommutative Hopf algebras, so their spectra are algebra supergroup schemes. These group schemes are closely related to the automorphisms of 1-dimensional additive formal groups. For example, if  then the dual Steenrod algebra is the group scheme of automorphisms of the 1-dimensional additive formal group scheme  that are the identity to first order. These automorphisms are of the form

Finite sub-Hopf algebras 
The  Steenrod algebra admits a filtration by finite sub-Hopf algebras. As  is generated by the elements 
,
we can form subalgebras  generated by the Steenrod squares
,
giving the filtration

Algebraic construction

 gave the following algebraic construction of the Steenrod algebra over a finite field  of order q. If V is a vector space over  then write SV for the symmetric algebra of V. There is an algebra homomorphism

where F is the Frobenius endomorphism of SV. If we put

or

Applications

Early applications of the Steenrod algebra were calculations by Jean-Pierre Serre of some homotopy groups of spheres, using the compatibility of transgressive differentials in the Serre spectral sequence with the Steenrod operations, and the classification by René Thom of smooth manifolds up to cobordism, through the identification of the graded ring of bordism classes with the homotopy groups of Thom complexes, in a stable range. The latter was refined to the case of oriented manifolds by C. T. C. Wall. A famous application of the Steenrod operations, involving factorizations through secondary cohomology operations associated to appropriate Adem relations, was the solution by J. Frank Adams of the Hopf invariant one problem. One application of the mod 2 Steenrod algebra that is fairly elementary is the following theorem.

Theorem. If there is a map  of Hopf invariant one, then n is a power of 2.

The proof uses the fact that each  is decomposable for k which is not a power of 2; that is, such an element is a product of squares of strictly smaller degree.

Michael A. Mandell gave a proof of the following theorem by studying the Steenrod algebra (with coefficients in the algebraic closure of ):

Theorem.

Connection to the Adams spectral sequence and the homotopy groups of spheres

The cohomology of the Steenrod algebra is the  term for the (p-local) Adams spectral sequence, whose abutment is the p-component of the stable homotopy groups of spheres. More specifically, the  term of this spectral sequence may be identified as

This is what is meant by the aphorism "the cohomology of the Steenrod algebra is an approximation to the stable homotopy groups of spheres."

See also

Pontryagin cohomology operation
Dual Steenrod algebra
Cohomology operation

References

Pedagogical

Characteristic classes – contains more calculations, such as for Wu manifolds
Steenrod squares in Adams spectral sequence – contains interpretations of Ext terms and Streenrod squares

Motivic setting 

 Reduced power operations in motivic cohomology
Motivic cohomology with Z/2-coefficients
 Motivic Eilenberg–Maclane spaces
 The homotopy of -motivic modular forms – relates  to motivic tmf

References

 Allen Hatcher, Algebraic Topology. Cambridge University Press, 2002. Available free online from the author's home page.

Algebraic topology
Hopf algebras